Cercospora angreci is a fungal plant pathogen.  It causes leaf spot in orchids.

References

angreci
Orchid diseases
Taxa named by Casimir Roumeguère